Taranis imporcata is a species of sea snail, a marine gastropod mollusk in the family Raphitomidae.

Description
The length of the shell attains 6 mm, its diameter 3 mm.

Distribution
This marine species is endemic to New Zealand and occurs off Taiaroa Heads, eastern Otago at a depth of 550 metres

References

 Dell R.K. 1962 Additional archibenthal Mollusca from New Zealand. Records of the Dominion Museum, 4 (6) : 67-76.
 Powell, A.W.B. 1979 New Zealand Mollusca: Marine, Land and Freshwater Shells, Collins, Auckland 
 Spencer, H.G., Marshall, B.A. & Willan, R.C. (2009). Checklist of New Zealand living Mollusca. Pp 196-219. in: Gordon, D.P. (ed.) New Zealand inventory of biodiversity. Volume one. Kingdom Animalia: Radiata, Lophotrochozoa, Deuterostomia. Canterbury University Press, Christchurch.

External links
 Powell, A. W. B. The family Turridae in the Indo-Pacific. Part 1a. The subfamily Turrinae concluded, Indo-Pacific mollusca. vol. 1, 1964
 
 Spencer H.G., Willan R.C., Marshall B.A. & Murray T.J. (2011). Checklist of the Recent Mollusca Recorded from the New Zealand Exclusive Economic Zone

imporcata
Gastropods described in 1962
Gastropods of New Zealand